OŠFK Šarišské Michaľany is a Slovak football team, based in the town of Šarišské Michaľany.

Current squad

Colours
Club colours are green, white, blue, yellow.

External links
Club website 
  
Club profile at Futbalnet.sk

References

Sport in Prešov Region
Football clubs in Slovakia
Association football clubs established in 1949
1949 establishments in Slovakia